Sûreté Nationale may refer to:

 Algerian police
 National Police (France)
 Sûreté Nationale (Morocco)
 Sûreté du Québec

See also 
 Sûreté